Count de Salis-Seewis (also written Comte or Graf v. Salis-Seewis / Graf Salis-Seewis / Graf Salis / Gräfin ["Countess"] von Salis / Graf von Salis) is a primogenitive title created in Versailles, France on 1 February 1777, while the title Graf (to follow the Count) was created in Vienna, Austria, 16 March 1915.

Comtes de Salis-Seewis (1777–1915)

 1) Johann Ulrich Dietegan (1740–1815), married (1760) Jakobea von Salis-Bothmar (1741–1791); 1st Count;
 2) Johann Gaudenz Gubert, (Malans 1762 - Malans 1834), poet, married Ursina von Pestalozzi; 2nd Count;
 3) Johann-Ulrich Dietegan (Chur 1794– Modena 1844), married Barbara von Cleric; 3rd Comte;
 4) (kaiserlich und königlich Hauptmann) Johann Gaudenz Gubert Dietegen (Malans 26.1.1824–1873), married (Agram 1857) Wilhelmine von Vranyczany-Dobrinović (Severin/Agram 1839 - Karlstadt 28.12.1898), daughter of Ambros von Vranyczany-Dobrinović by Julie Tompa de Horsova; 4th Count;

Counts of Salis-Seewis (after 1915)
 5)  Johann Ulrich Graf von Salis-Seewis (Karlovac 1862 — Zagreb 1940); Military Governor of MGG/S Serbia, (1 January — 6 July 1916) buried at Mirogoj Cemetery, Zagreb, Yugoslavia; 5th Count, 1st Graf;
 6) Johann Gaudenz Peter Dietegan, (*Malans 4.3.1866-Zagreb 11.8.1941), married (Vienna 17.4.1899) Marie v. Liebenberg de Zsittin (Königsberg 1876-), daughter of Adolf von Liebenberg; lived in Salzburg. 6th Comte, 2nd Graf;
 7) (His Excellency Monseignor) Francesco/Franjo/Franz Emil Dietegan (Karlovac/Karlstadt 15.1.1872–27.10.1967), Auxiliary Bishop of Zagreb/Agram, Yugoslavia, 1926–1967; critic of attempts to reconcile Catholic doctrine with evolution; 7th Count, 3rd Graf;
 8) (Dr.) Hans-Wolf Wolf Eugen Rudolf (Malans 17.5.1887–1959), I.C.R.C.; married (Bern, 8.6.1895) Marguerite Freiin v. Salis-Soglio, daughter of Ferdinand Freiherr von Salis-Soglio by Elizabeth v. Muralt; 8th Count, 4th Graf;
 9) Franz Ferdinand Rudolf Dietegan (Samedan 9.8.1921 - New York 24.1.2000), of West Caldwell, New Jersey; married (Zurich 19.5.1951) Evelyne Patricia Iselin (17.04.1926-), daughter of Henry Iselin of Hewlett Harbor, L.I., a former senior partner of Rusch & Company Factors in New York; 9th Count, 5th Graf;
 10) Johann-Gaudenz Ulrich Dietegan (born 1936, Samedan), married Isabelle v. Graffenreid; 10th Count, 6th Graf. Swiss diplomat and ambassador.

Motto: Non auro sed virtute.

'Nächster Anwärter auf den Grafentitel' (next contender): Friedrich Heinrich Dietegan (born 1968).

Ancestor table of present Comte

References

House of Salis
Counts of Salis
Counts de Salis-Soglio and Comtes de Salis-Seewis
Swiss nobility